Xenophrys aceras, commonly known as the Perak horned toad, Perak spadefoot toad or Malayan horned frog, is a species of frog in the family Megophryidae found in Peninsular Malaysia and Thailand, and possibly in Indonesia. Its common name refers to its type locality, Bukit Besar in Perak state, Malaysia.

Description
They have smooth back with scattered warts and low ridges and short dermal projections on top of the eyelids (the "horn"). The dorsal colour is variable from grey, brown to bright orange; they usually have a triangular mark between the eyes. Ventral side is brown.

Habitat
Its natural habitats are tropical moist lowland forests and moist montane forests. Tadpoles develop in forest streams. While it is a widespread species and classified by IUCN as of "Least Concern", it is potentially threatened by habitat loss.

References

Xenophrys
Amphibians of Malaysia
Amphibians of Thailand
Taxonomy articles created by Polbot
Amphibians described in 1903